KBQB (92.7 FM, "Bob-FM") is a commercial radio station located in Chico, California.  KBQB airs an adult hits music format.

The station signed on the air in 1993 as KLRS and branded as "Colors 92.7 FM".  It played the Top 40 (CHR) music format and was one of the most popular stations in the market.  The format changed to the current "BOB 92.7 FM" format in 2006.

External links
Results Radio Website
KBQB official website

BQB
Adult hits radio stations in the United States
Bob FM stations
Radio stations established in 1993
1993 establishments in California